Helen Johns (born April 24, 1953) is a former politician in Ontario, Canada. She was a Progressive Conservative member of the Legislative Assembly of Ontario from 1995 to 2003 and served as a cabinet minister in the governments of Mike Harris and Ernie Eves.

Background
Johns was born in Toronto, Ontario. She attended York University, the University of Windsor and Simon Fraser University where she majored in business and commerce.  She worked as a controller of small and medium-sized businesses for fifteen years before entering public life, and was also the Director and Treasurer of the Huron United Way.

Politics
Johns was elected to the Ontario legislature in the provincial election of 1995, defeating Liberal John Jewitt and incumbent New Democrat Paul Klopp in the riding of Huron.  For the next four years, she served as a backbench government member.

Prior to the 1999 election, the number of seats was reduced from 130 to 103. Johns and fellow MPP Barb Fisher (riding of Bruce) competed for the Tory nomination in the redistributed riding of Huron—Bruce. Johns won the nomination battle. In the ensuing election campaign, she narrowly defeated Liberal candidate Ross Lamont.  On June 17, 1999, she was named Citizenship, Culture and Recreation.  Following a cabinet shuffle on February 8, 2001, she was named Associate Minister of Health and Long-Term Care, under Tony Clement.

When Ernie Eves replaced Harris as Premier on April 15, 2002, he named Johns as his Minister of Agriculture and Food. and also served as interim Minister of Municipal Affairs and Housing in early 2003.

In the 2003 provincial election she was defeated by Liberal Carol Mitchell by about 3,000 votes.

Cabinet positions

Electoral record

References

External links

1953 births
Women government ministers of Canada
Living people
Members of the Executive Council of Ontario
Politicians from Toronto
Progressive Conservative Party of Ontario MPPs
Simon Fraser University alumni
University of Windsor alumni
Women MPPs in Ontario
York University alumni
21st-century Canadian politicians
21st-century Canadian women politicians